Graves Mill, also known as Jones Mill and Beech Grove Mill, is a historic grist mill complex located near Wolftown, Madison County, Virginia. The complex includes a three-story, heavy timber frame gristmill; a two-story, log, frame, and weatherboard miller's house; and a one-story heavy timber frame barn. The gristmill was built about 1798, probably on the foundation of an earlier gristmill built about 1745.  It was owned and operated by members of the Thomas Graves family for more than a century.

It was listed on the National Register of Historic Places in 2006.

References

Grinding mills on the National Register of Historic Places in Virginia
Industrial buildings completed in 1798
Buildings and structures in Madison County, Virginia
National Register of Historic Places in Madison County, Virginia
Grinding mills in Virginia
1798 establishments in Virginia